Mine Alone is a 2001 Spanish drama film directed by . It stars Sergi López and Paz Vega alongside Elvira Mínguez.

Plot 
The plot follows a situation of intimate partner violence enacted by Joaquín (a successful publicist) on Ángela (a company receptionist), shortly after their marriage.

Cast

Production 
The screenplay was penned by Álvaro García Mohedano and Javier Balaguer. The film is a Star Line production, with the participation of TVE and Vía Digital. Juan Alexander was credited as producer. Juan Molina worked as cinematographer whereas  took over film editing.

Release 
The film screened as the opening film of the 46th Valladolid International Film Festival (Seminci) on 26 October 2001. Distributed by Buena Vista International Spain, the film was theatrically released in Spain on 31 October 2001.

Reception 
Jonathan Holland of Variety wrote that Javier Balaguer's debut film, featuring "superb script and sterling performances" is "an intense, gripping and timely exploration of domestic violence".

The review in Fotogramas rated the film 3 out of 5 stars, extolling the "superb" performance delivered by Paz Vega, while pointing out at "a certain predictability, which can only be attributed to reality" as a negative point.

Accolades 

|-
| align = "center" rowspan = "4" | 2002 || rowspan = "4" | 16th Goya Awards || Best New Director || Javier Balaguer ||  || rowspan = "4" | 
|-
| Best Actress || Paz Vega || 
|-
| Best Actor || Sergi López || 
|-
| Best Original Song || Eusebio Bonilla, Clara Montes || 
|}

See also 
 List of Spanish films of 2001

References

External links 

2001 drama films
2001 films
Films about domestic violence
Films about rape
Spanish drama films
2000s Spanish-language films
2000s Spanish films